Komi-Permyak Autonomous Okrug was a federal subject of Russia until November 30, 2005.  On December 1, 2005, it was merged with Perm Oblast to form Perm Krai .  During the transitional period of 2006–2008, it retains a special status within Perm Krai.

Cities and towns under the autonomous okrug's jurisdiction:
Kudymkar (Кудымкар) (administrative center)
Districts:
Gaynsky (Гайнский)
with 12 selsovets under the district's jurisdiction.
Kochyovsky (Кочёвский)
with 7 selsovets under the district's jurisdiction.
Kosinsky (Косинский)
with 9 selsovets under the district's jurisdiction.
Kudymkarsky (Кудымкарский)
with 20 selsovets under the district's jurisdiction.
Yurlinsky (Юрлинский)
with 12 selsovets under the district's jurisdiction.
Yusvinsky (Юсьвинский)
with 16 selsovets under the district's jurisdiction.

References

See also
Administrative divisions of Perm Oblast
Administrative divisions of Perm Krai

Perm Krai
Komi